Perry Wayne Ouzts (born July 7, 1954, in Lepanto, Arkansas) is a jockey in Thoroughbred horse racing whose 7, 065 wins through March 30, 2020 ranks him seventh all-time among jockeys in North America. Through Nov. 9, 2022, Ouzts has ridden 11 horses who earned $100,000 or more in a start.  His mounts have earned $50,360,834.

Riding career
Ouzts' career began in 1973 at Beulah Park racetrack in Columbus, Ohio where his first victory came in March of that year. He would go on to win a record thirty five meet titles at River Downs in Cincinnati, Ohio, two meet titles at Turfway park, and thirteen meet titles at Beulah Park.

Perry Ouzts' career was the subject of the documentary film titled "Ironman Perry Ouzts" that won the 2015 Media Eclipse Award for Television-Feature  documentary. 

By September 21. 2018 Perry Ouzts became only the ninth jockey in North American racing history to achieve 7,000 career wins.

References

1954 births
living people
American jockeys
People from Lepanto, Arkansas